FMO is a Dutch development bank structured as a bilateral private-sector international financial institution based in the Hague, the Netherlands. FMO manages funds for the Ministries of Foreign Affairs and Economic Affairs of the Dutch government to maximize the development impact of private sector investments. It is licensed as a bank and supervised by the Dutch Central Bank.

The Dutch government holds 51% of the shares, but FMO operates as a commercial company.  Due to its relationship with the Dutch government, it is able to take risks which commercial financiers are not able or not prepared to take.  The FMO has a AAA rating from Standard and Poor's.  , the bank's total asset valuation was €8.32 billion (US$9.67 billion), and its shareholders' equity was €2.83 billion (US$3.29 billion).

FMO's mandate is to provide long term capital for projects in countries in which commercial investors do not yet dare to invest. It invests risk capital in companies and financial institutions in developing countries and has a strict policy on maximizing development impact with a methodology designed to make sure that FMO's return on investment is not just financial but also has positive environmental and social effects. Investments to date include Yoco, WWF and other NGOs in Paraguay's Agricultural sector.

History

FMO was founded in 1970 by the Dutch Government in conjunction with commercial banks, the national employers' association, labor unions, and private investors to invest in private sector projects in developing countries and emerging markets. In March 2008, FMO achieved bank status; the bank has been under the supervision of the Dutch Central Bank (DNB) since then.

Objectives
FMO manages funds for the Ministries of Foreign Affairs and Economic Affairs of the Dutch government to maximize the development impact of private sector investments. For instance, the Capacity Development Program provides funding with the aim to create access to management and technical know-how.

Controversial investments
In 2009 the FMO invested in a coal power plant near Bargny in Senegal, called Sendou I. The project triggered a debate about the impact on the environmental circumstances of the inhabitants. Following this, the Independent Complaints Mechanism of FMO has undertaken a Compliance Review and a Mediation process, in reaction to which the Management Board of FMO has written an official response

Ownership
The stock of FMO is held by individual, corporate and public Dutch entities as outlined in the table below:

See also
 List of banks in the Netherlands
 Belgian Investment Company for Developing Countries
 German Investment Corporation
 Danish International Development Agency
 French Development Agency

References

Banks established in 1970
Banks of the Netherlands
Development finance institutions
Government-owned companies of the Netherlands
International finance institutions
Dutch companies established in 1970